Neuronal acetylcholine receptor subunit alpha-1, also known as nAChRα1, is a protein that in humans is encoded by the CHRNA1 gene. The protein encoded by this gene is a subunit of certain nicotinic acetylcholine receptors (nAchR).

The muscle acetylcholine receptor consists of 5 subunits of 4 different types: 2 alpha isoforms and 1 each of beta, gamma, and delta subunits.2 This gene encodes an alpha subunit that plays a role in acetylcholine binding/channel gating. Alternatively spliced transcript variants encoding different isoforms have been identified.

Interactions 

Cholinergic receptor, nicotinic, alpha 1 has been shown to interact with CHRND.

See also 
 Nicotinic acetylcholine receptor

References

Further reading

External links 
 

Ion channels
Nicotinic acetylcholine receptors